The Hamburg Tapes is a live album released by the hard rock band Gotthard. The album was recorded April 22, 1996 at the Hamburg Markthalle. The Compact Disc was officially released only in Asian markets.

Track listing
All songs written by Steve Lee/Leo Leoni/Chris von Rohr except where noted.

 "In the Name" – 5:24
 "I'm Your Travellin' Man" – 6:42 (Andris/Meyer/Jamison)
 "Mountain Mama" – 4:36
 "The Mighty Quinn" – 5:06 (Bob Dylan)
 "Hole In One" – 8:53

Personnel
 Steve Lee – vocals
 Leo Leoni – guitar
 Marc Lynn – bass guitar
 Hena Habegger - drums

Tour musician:
 Neil Otupacca – keyboards
 Mandy Meyer - guitar

Production
 Mixing – Jurg Naegeli
 Assistant mixing – Leo Leoni and Chris von Rohr

External links
Heavy Harmonies page
German fanpage entry

Gotthard (band) albums
Albums recorded at Markthalle Hamburg
1996 live albums